Luca Stulli, also Luko Stulić, (1772–1828) was a scientist from the Republic of Ragusa (Republic of Dubrovnik) in today's southern Croatia who first made epidemiological studies of heritable skin disorders. His treatise of what became the Mljet disease (after the Adriatic island of Mljet) is a classic in dermatological literature.

He began studying medicine at the University of Bologna in 1792, graduating in 1795, from there he travelled to Florence and then to Naples, where he worked under the doctors Cotunnio and Cirillo.

See also

 Republic of Ragusa
 List of notable Ragusans
 Dubrovnik
 Dalmatia
 History of Dalmatia

References

Trattenimento Accademico per i signori Marino di Pozza, Luca Stulli, Giovanni di Natali, Giovanni Dinarich studenti di Filosofia il primo anno del loro corso nel Collegio delle Scuole Pie il dì 31. Maggio 1791. Ragusa : Andrea Trevisan, 1791
A perpetua onoranza del dottor Luca Stulli di Ragusi Prose e versi, Stulli, Luka
Prose e versi ad onore del dottor Luca Stulli di Ragusa, Ferruccio, Michele 1829

Croatian scientists
People from Dubrovnik
Italian dermatologists
Ragusan scholars
1772 births
1828 deaths
19th-century Italian scientists